The women's 10,000 metres event at the 2007 World Championships in Athletics took place on 25 August 2007 at the Nagai Stadium in Osaka, Japan.

In August 2015, the Turkish Athletic Federation confirmed that an anti-doping test sample collected from Elvan Abeylegesse during these World Championships had been retested and found to be positive for a controlled substance and that the athlete had been temporarily suspended pending retesting of her "B-sample". On 29 March 2017, the International Association of Athletics Federations confirmed the positive test and expunged her results from 25 August 2007 until 25 August 2009.

Medallists

Records

Results

References

Full results - IAAF.org

10000 metres
10,000 metres at the World Athletics Championships
2007 in women's athletics